The Wheel is the eighth studio album by singer-songwriter Rosanne Cash.  Most of the songs on the album reflected Cash's feelings on embarking on a new relationship (with music producer John Leventhal, whom she would eventually marry) after the dissolution of her marriage to Rodney Crowell.  Though neither of its two singles, "The Wheel" and "You Won't Let Me In", charted on the Billboard Hot Country Singles & Tracks chart, the album received considerable critical acclaim. A video was produced for "The Wheel".

Track listing
All songs by Rosanne Cash, except where noted.
"The Wheel" – 4:20
"Seventh Avenue" (Rosanne Cash, John Leventhal) – 5:14
"Change Partners" – 3:41
"Sleeping in Paris" – 4:06
"You Won't Let Me In" – 4:31
"From the Ashes" – 3:58
"The Truth About You" (Cash, Leventhal) – 2:29
"Tears Falling Down" (Cash, Leventhal) – 3:27
"Roses in the Fire" – 3:25
"Fire of the Newly Alive" (Cash, Leventhal) – 4:28
"If There's a God on My Side" – 4:51

Musicians
Rosanne Cash – vocals, acoustic guitar
Benmont Tench – piano, keyboards
Mary Chapin Carpenter – background vocals
Patty Larkin – background vocals
Marc Cohn – harmony vocals
Bruce Cockburn – harmony vocals
John Leventhal – guitars, mandolin, bass guitar, piano, organ, keyboards, harmonica, percussion, background vocals
Steuart Smith – guitar, acoustic guitar
Lincoln Shleifer – bass guitar
Zev Katz – bass guitar, acoustic bass
Frank Vilardi – drums, percussion
Steve Gaboury – organ
Charlie Giordano – accordion
Dennis McDermott – drums
Tommy Malone – harmony vocals
Catherine Russell – background vocals

Charts

References

1993 albums
Rosanne Cash albums
Albums produced by John Leventhal
Columbia Records albums